Ateuchosaurus is a genus of skinks, lizards in the family Scincidae. The genus contains only two species which are indigenous to East Asia and Southeast Asia.

Taxonomy
The genus Ateuchosaurus is usually placed in the subfamily Scincinae. This group seems to be paraphyletic however, and the present genus is apparently not closely related to most or all of them. Different molecular studies find Ateuchosarus to instead to be more closely related either to Acontias or to lygosomine skinks, and it is therefore sometimes considered to represent a distinct family or subfamily.

Species
The following species are recognized as being valid.
Ateuchosaurus chinensis  – Chinese short-limbed skink, Chinese ateuchosaurus
Ateuchosaurus pellopleurus  – Ryukyu short-legged skink

Nota bene: A binomial authority in parentheses indicates that the species was originally described in a genus other than Ateuchosaurus.

References

Further reading
Gray, John Edward (1845). Catalogue of the Specimens of Lizards in the Collection of the British Museum. London: Trustees of the British Museum. (Edward Newman, printer). xxviii + 289 pp. (Ateuchosaurus, new genus, p. 107; A. chinensis, new species, p. 107).
Hallowell, Edward (1861). "Report upon the Reptilia of the North Pacific Exploring Expedition, under command of Capt. John Rogers, U. S. N.". Proceedings of the Academy of Natural Sciences of Philadelphia 12: 480–510. (Lygosaurus pellopleurus, new species, pp. 496–497).

Ateuchosaurus
Lizard genera
Taxa named by John Edward Gray